María Amuchástegui (16 January 1953 – 19 July 2017) was an Argentine television fitness instructor, ballerina, and singer. She was born in Buenos Aires. She became well known in Argentina in the 1980s. Her best known morning fitness shows were Buen día Salud and Buen Día, María, both were made in the 1980s. She was also best known for the 2006 song "Camino de espejos".

Career
In 1983, she conducted her Buen día Salud program, which was broadcast in the morning of ATC until 1986. She then moved on to Channel 11 and El Trece with a more journalistic and higher-volume program, which she called Buen Día, María. She was accompanied by Dr. Eduardo Lorenzo Borocoto, who provided data on physical health, and a group of girls who were called Las Marias.

She continued working with Telefe until 2012.

Personal life
Amuchástegui was born in Buenos Aires. He was married to Juan Alberdi until they divorced. They had one son, Juan (born 1988).

Amuchástegui died in Buenos Aires on 19 July 2017 of a stroke complicated by lung cancer at the age of 64.

Discography
 2005. Camino de espejos - CNR DISCOS S.R.L.

References

External links
 

1953 births
2017 deaths
Argentine television actresses
20th-century Argentine women singers
Argentine ballerinas
Singers from Buenos Aires
Deaths from lung cancer in Argentina
Actresses from Buenos Aires
20th-century Argentine actresses
21st-century Argentine actresses